The IMOCA 60 Class yacht Brit Air (2) sail number FRA 62 was designed by Finot-Conq and launched in the July 2007 after being built Multiplast in France. Not to be confused with the IMOCA 60 Sodebo was rebranded for the 2006 season and competed as Brit Air while this boat was inbuild.

Racing results

References 

Individual sailing vessels
2000s sailing yachts
Sailing yachts designed by Finot-Conq
Vendée Globe boats
IMOCA 60